Safe in a Crazy World is the second album by Corrinne May, released in 2005 by the independent Pink Armchair Records label. The album was released in Japan by S2S records and by Warner Music Singapore.

Track listing
"Little Superhero Girl"
"Save Me"
"Free"
"Everything in its Time"
"Safe in a Crazy World"
"Let it Go"
"Angel in Disguise"
"If I Kissed You"
"The Birthday Song"
"Every Beat of My Heart"
"Free (Radio Edit)"

References

2005 albums
Corrinne May albums